Mianhua Islet is a  high island in Zhongzheng District, Keelung, Taiwan, located in the East China Sea. Pingfong Rock, just east of the islet, is the easternmost point under the actual control of Taiwan (ROC).

Name
Mianhua Islet is also known as Kangjiao Islet, Jhongdao (Midway Islet), Mien-hua Hsü, Menka-sho, Mienhua Yu, and Craig Island.

History
In his 1868 book Rambles of a Naturalist on the Shores and Waters of the China Sea, Cuthbert Collingwood (naturalist) described Mianhua Islet, its birds and insects, its geology and two people on the island who were collecting bird eggs.

In his 1895 book From Far Formosa, George Leslie Mackay briefly described Mianhua Islet:

Mackay also described the collection of birds and bird eggs by people from Pengjia Islet.

In 1994, plans for a scenic area including Mianhua Islet were proposed. These plans met with opposition from conservation groups who argued that the natural environment of the islet would be damaged by the creation of a scenic area. From May to September, seven scientific expeditions documenting the birds, geology, plants, insects, amphibians and reptiles of the islet were carried out, and an application to the Environmental Protection Administration to preserve Mianhua Islet and Huaping Islet as a Level One Ecologically Sensitive Area and Pengjia Islet as a Level Two Ecologically Sensitive Area was made.

On March 18, 1996, the Mianhua Islet and Huaping Islet Wildlife Preservation Area was established.

In August 1996, the existing population of sheep on the islet was relocated to Taiwan to help restore the natural environment of the islet.

Geography
Along with the nearby Pengjia Islet and Huaping Islet, Mianhua Islet is considered of strategic importance to Taiwan.

See also
 List of islands in the East China Sea
 List of islands of Taiwan
 List of Taiwanese superlatives

References

External links
 20171231【808】MIT台灣誌 北方三島追鳥事一二 登棉花嶼 探查奇異大鳥 ('31 Dec 2017 Made in Taiwan Annals of Taiwan #808: Northern Three Islets Birdwatching  Landing on Mianhua Islet  Searching for the Strange Albatross') 

Islands of Taiwan
Islands of the East China Sea
Landforms of Keelung